The 1951 San Remo Grand Prix was a non-Championship Formula One motor race held on 22 April 1951 at the Autodromo di Ospedaletti, in San Remo, Liguria, Italy. It was the fourth race of the 1951 Formula One season. The 90-lap race was won by Ferrari driver Alberto Ascari, starting from pole position. Dorino Serafini finished second in a Ferrari and Rudi Fischer third, also in a Ferrari. All cars were 1.5-litre s/c F1 or 4.5-litre F1† unless noted (F2). During practice, Claes crashed his Talbot after a brake pipe broke, injuring four and killing one spectator, Antonino Cavestri.

Classification

References

 Ospedaletti Circuit blog 1951

San Remo
San Remo
San Remo Grand Prix